Petersen is a common Danish patronymic surname, meaning "son of Peter". There are other spellings. Petersen may refer to:

People

In arts and entertainment
 Adolf Dahm-Petersen, Norwegian voice specialist
 Anja Petersen, German operatic soprano and university lecturer 
 Anker Eli Petersen, Faroese writer and artist
 Ann Petersen, Belgian actress
 Chris Petersen (born 1963), American child actor
 Devon Petersen (born 1986), South African darts player
 Elmer Petersen, American artist
 Gustaf Munch-Petersen, Danish writer and painter
 Joel Petersen, bass guitarist
 John Hahn-Petersen, Danish actor
 Josef Petersen, Danish novelist
 Patrick Petersen, American actor
 Paul Petersen, American movie actor, singer, novelist, and activist
 Robert E. Petersen, publisher, auto museum founder
 Robert Storm Petersen, Danish cartoonist, writer, animator, illustrator, painter and humorist
 Sandy Petersen, American game designer
 Uwe Fahrenkrog-Petersen, German musician
 William Petersen, American actor
 Wolfgang Petersen (1941–2022), German film director

In government and politics
 Alicia O'Shea Petersen, Australian activist
 Alfonso Petersen, Mayor of Guadalajara, Mexico
 Andrew Petersen, member of the United States House of Representatives
 Carl Wilhelm Petersen (1868–1933), German politician and first mayor of Hamburg 
 Chap (John Chapman) Petersen, American, Virginia politician
 Cynthia Petersen, Canadian judge 
 Elsebeth Kock-Petersen, Danish politician
 Ewa Hedkvist Petersen, Swedish politician
 Flo Bjelke-Petersen, Australian politician and writer
 George Petersen, Australian politician
 Hans Christian Petersen, Norwegian politician
 Harald Petersen, Danish politician
 Hjalmar Petersen, American politician
 Jan Petersen, Norwegian diplomat and politician
 Joh Bjelke-Petersen, Australian politician
 Marita Petersen, Faroese politician
 Matthew S. Petersen, U.S. Federal Election Commission member
 Niels Helveg Petersen, Danish politician
 P. Walter Petersen, American politician
 Søren Jessen-Petersen, Danish United Nations official

In music
 Petersen Zagaze Zambian singer and song writer.

In military
 Danny J. Petersen, American Medal of Honor recipient
 Forrest S. Petersen, United States Navy admiral and aviator
 Frank E. Petersen, retired United States Marine Corps lieutenant general
 Sigmund R. Petersen, National Oceanic and Atmospheric Administration Commissioned Officer Corps (NOAA Corps) rear admiral and fourth Director of the NOAA Corps

In religion
 Mark E. Petersen, member of Quorum of the Twelve Apostles (LDS Church)
 Ole Peter Petersen, founder of Methodism in Norway

In sport
 Alviro Petersen, South African cricketer
 Cal Petersen (born 1994), professional ice hockey goaltender
 Chris Petersen (born 1964), American football coach
 Ike Petersen, American football player
 Johannes Petersen, Danish chess master
 Lou Petersen, New Zealand dual-code rugby international
 Matthew Petersen, Australian rugby player
 Morten Petersen, Danish football player
 Nils Petersen, German football player
 Sara Petersen (badminton), New Zealand badminton player
 Sara Petersen (hurdler), Danish 400 metres hurdler
 Ted Petersen, football player
 Thyge Petersen, Danish boxer

In other fields
 Anders Petersen (disambiguation)
 Carl Petersen (disambiguation)
 Grant Petersen, American bicycle company owner
 Jack Petersen (disambiguation)
 Johan Carl Christian Petersen, Danish seaman, interpreter, and Arctic explorer
 Julius Petersen, Danish mathematician
 Julius Petersen, Literary scholar and university professor
 Rodney L. Petersen, American scholar of history, ethics, and religious conflict
 Ron Petersen (born 1934), American mycologist with the standard author abbreviation "R.H.Petersen"
 Sophie Petersen (1885–1965), Danish geographer

Other uses
 Petersen (film), a 1974 Australian drama film
 Petersen Automotive Museum
 Petersen Bay, Greenland
 Petersen Graph, famous for its special properties in graph theory

See also
 Bjelke-Petersen
 Pedersen, surname
 Peterson (surname)

Danish-language surnames
Norwegian-language surnames
Swedish-language surnames
Patronymic surnames
Surnames from given names